Aziz Ansah (born 7 October 1980) is a Ghanaian former professional footballer who played as defender.

Club career
Ansah was born in Ghana. He moved to F.C. Dallas during the 2010 transfer window from the Nigerian CAF Champions League runners up Heartland F.C. He was released from the F.C. Dallas less than two months later in February 2010, having only played preseason matches.

International career
Ansah first played international football for Ghana as a midfielder at the 1997 FIFA U-17 World Championship in Egypt, where Ghana were the losing finalist to Brazil. He later went on to receive nine full international caps and was part of Ghana's squad at the 2006 Africa Cup of Nations in Egypt, but subsequently missed out on a place in the squad for the 2006 FIFA World Cup.

References

External links

Player Profile : Aziz Ansah – Ghanaweb.com

Living people
1980 births
Association football defenders
Ghanaian footballers
Ghana under-20 international footballers
Ghana international footballers
2006 Africa Cup of Nations players
Israeli Premier League players
Accra Great Olympics F.C. players
K.R.C. Zuid-West-Vlaanderen players
S.S.C. Napoli players
R.W.D.M. Brussels F.C. players
Asante Kotoko S.C. players
F.C. Ashdod players
Heartland F.C. players
Ghanaian expatriate footballers
Expatriate footballers in Belgium
Ghanaian expatriate sportspeople in Italy
Expatriate footballers in Italy
Ghanaian expatriate sportspeople in Israel
Expatriate footballers in Israel
Ghanaian expatriate sportspeople in Bahrain
Expatriate footballers in Bahrain
Ghanaian expatriate sportspeople in Nigeria
Expatriate footballers in Nigeria
Expatriate soccer players in the United States